Senator Warnick may refer to:
Judith Warnick (born 1950), Washington State Senate
Spencer K. Warnick (1874–1954), New York State Senate

See also
Frank Warnke (1933–2011), Washington State Senate
William R. Warnock (1838–1918), Ohio State Senate